Larry Alonzo Johnson (May 15, 1938 – August 6, 2016) was an American blues singer and guitarist.

Life and career
Johnson was born in Wrightsville, Georgia.  His father was a preacher who traveled extensively.  This led to Johnson being exposed to blues records by Blind Boy Fuller, who inspired Johnson to learn the rudiments of guitar playing. He served in the Navy between 1955 and 1959, before relocating to New York City.  After his befriending Brownie and Stick McGhee, Johnson found employment recording with Big Joe Williams, Harry Atkins, and Alec Seward. The latter gave Johnson an introduction to Reverend Gary Davis.

Johnson's first single release was "Catfish Blues" / "So Sweet" (1962). His first album was produced by iconic blues writer/producer Sam Charters on Prestige Records entitled The Blues/A New Generation (PR 7142), in 1964. Hank Adkins was his second guitarist on this record. He made numerous live appearances with Davis over that decade. In 1971, Johnson released Fast and Funky, but his live playing gradually reduced. A couple of low key albums appeared in the 1980s, before Johnson received more regular live work in the 1990s, particularly in Europe. Whilst there his output included Railroad Man (1990) and Blues for Harlem (1999). Two Gun Green followed in 2002.

Johnson died on August 6, 2016, aged 78, in a nursing home in Harlem, New York.

Discography

Albums
 Larry Johnson (1962)
  "The Blues: A New Generation" with Hank Atkins (Prestige, 1965)
 Presenting the Country Blues (1970)
 Fast And Funky (1971)
 Blues from the Apple (1974)
 Larry Johnson (1974) Biograph BLP-12028
 Johnson! Where Did You Get That Sound (1983)
 Basin Free (1984)
 Railroad Man (1990)
 Blues for Harlem (1999)
 Two Gun Green (2002)
 The Gentle Side of Larry Johnson (2004)

See also
 Blue Goose Records

References

External links
 Larry Johnson on allaboutbluesmusic.com

1938 births
2016 deaths
American blues guitarists
American male guitarists
American blues singers
American male singers
Electric blues musicians
Guitarists from Georgia (U.S. state)
20th-century American guitarists
20th-century American male musicians
Southland Records artists